The College of Education and Integrative Studies (CEIS) at Cal Poly Pomona has 4 departments.

Admissions

References

External links
 

California State Polytechnic University, Pomona
Schools of education in California